Genko Papazov (born 21 January 1972) is a former Bulgarian footballer who played for FC Chirpan and Metalurg Pernik.

References

1972 births
Living people
Bulgarian footballers
First Professional Football League (Bulgaria) players
Association footballers not categorized by position